These are the international rankings of Jamaica

International rankings

References

Jamaica-related lists
Jamaica